Lampugnano is a district (quartiere) of Milan, Italy

Lampugnano may also refer to:

 Lampugnano, underground station on Line 1 of the Milan Metro in Milan, Italy. 
 Giorgio Lampugnano, university professor of Pavia and father of the Ambrosian Republic

See also 

 Lampugnani (disambiguation)